Bruno Rajaonson is a Malagasy politician.  He candidated in the constituency of Marovoay for the National Assembly of Madagascar, though obtained only 17.53% of votes. He was not elected.

References

Year of birth missing (living people)
Living people
Malagasy politicians
Place of birth missing (living people)